SMOFcon is an annual convention that focuses on the organisation of science fiction conventions. The first SMOFcon took place in 1984, and most have taken place in the United States.

SMOFcon typically attracts 100-150 attendees, and usually occurs in the first weekend of December, though other dates have been known. The content includes formal and informal sessions covering insights from events held in the previous year, information about the latest trends from the community and external experts, reviews of previous events and feedback to bidders for upcoming events, with a focus on learnings that can be widely shared.

A significant number of SMOFcon attendees are also Worldcon organisers and the programme usually includes sessions about the most recent Worldcon and on bids for future Worldcons.

The name of the convention is derived from the word SMOF (also spelled smof), which is an acronym which stands for "Secret Master(s) Of Fandom" and is a term used within the science fiction fan community. Its coining is generally attributed to science fiction author Jack L. Chalker.

List of SMOFcons

References

External links 
SMOFcon official website
The Conrunner's Wiki
OED Citations for SMOF

Science fiction conventions
Recurring events established in 1984